An archipelago, sometimes called an island group or island chain, is a chain, cluster, or collection of islands, or sometimes a sea containing a small number of scattered islands.

Examples of archipelagos include: the Indonesian Archipelago, the Andaman and Nicobar Islands, the Lakshadweep Islands, the Galápagos Islands, the Japanese archipelago, the Philippine Archipelago, the Maldives, the Balearic Islands, The Bahamas, the Aegean Islands, the Hawaiian Islands, the Canary Islands, Malta, the Azores, the Canadian Arctic Archipelago, the British Isles, the islands of the Archipelago Sea, and Shetland. They are sometimes defined by political boundaries. For example, the Gulf archipelago off the northeastern Pacific coast forms part of a larger archipelago that geographically includes Washington state's San Juan Islands; while the Gulf archipelago and San Juan Islands are geographically related, they are not technically included in the same archipelago due to manmade geopolitical borders.

Etymology
The word archipelago is derived from the Ancient Greek ἄρχι-(arkhi-, "chief") and πέλαγος (pélagos, "sea") through the Italian arcipelago. In antiquity, "Archipelago" (from Medieval Greek *ἀρχιπέλαγος and Latin ) was the proper name for the Aegean Sea. Later, usage shifted to refer to the Aegean Islands (since the sea has a large number of islands).

Geographic types
Archipelagos may be found isolated in large amounts of water or neighbouring a large land mass. For example, Scotland has more than 700 islands surrounding its mainland, which form an archipelago.

Archipelagos are often volcanic, forming along island arcs generated by subduction zones or hotspots, but may also be the result of erosion, deposition, and land elevation. Depending on their geological origin, islands forming archipelagos can be referred to as oceanic islands, continental fragments, or continental islands.

Oceanic islands
Oceanic islands are mainly of volcanic origin, and widely separated from any adjacent continent. The Hawaiian Islands and Galapagos Islands in the Pacific, and Mascarene Islands in the south Indian Ocean are examples.

Continental fragments
Continental fragments correspond to land masses that have separated from a continental mass due to tectonic displacement. The Farallon Islands off the coast of California are an example.

Continental archipelagos

Sets of islands formed close to the coast of a continent are considered continental archipelagos when they form part of the same continental shelf, when those islands are above-water extensions of the shelf. The islands of the Inside Passage off the coast of British Columbia and the Canadian Arctic Archipelago are examples.

Artificial archipelagos
Artificial archipelagos have been created in various countries for different purposes. Palm Islands and The World Islands off Dubai were or are being created for leisure and tourism purposes. Marker Wadden in the Netherlands is being built as a conservation area for birds and other wildlife.

Superlatives

The largest archipelago in the world is the Archipelago Sea which is part of Finland. There are approximately 40,000, mostly uninhabited, islands 

The largest archipelagic state in the world by area, and by population, is Indonesia.

See also 

 Island arc
 List of landforms
 List of archipelagos by number of islands
 List of archipelagos
 Archipelagic state
 List of islands
 Aquapelago

References

External links 

 
 30 Most Incredible Island Archipelagos

 
Coastal and oceanic landforms
Oceanographical terminology